Piss Frond is a double CD 1999 album by Dead Voices on Air.

Track listing

Credits
Mark Spybey - composer, performer, artwork, producer
Darryl Neudorf - sounds (tracks 1 - 8)
Sugarpill (Tracy Pillsworth) - Moog synthesizer (track 1), ARP Chroma (tracks 1, 4, 5), Roland Rhythm 77 (track 3), outro voice (track 2), vocals (tracks 4, 8)
Abintra (Darryl Neudorf and Sugarpill) - co-producer (tracks 1 - 8)
Finn Manniche - cello (tracks 3, 4, 6)
Alexander Varty - guitar (tracks 1 - 3, 5, 7, 8)
Thomas Anselmi - guitar (track 1)
Chris Houston - guitar (track 1)
Ryan Moore - drums (tracks 1, 2), bass (tracks 5, 7)
Peter Bourne - drums (track 7)

References

1999 albums